The Fanfani III Cabinet was the 16th cabinet of the Italian Republic, which held office from 27 July 1960 to 22 February 1962, for a total of 575 days, or 1 year, 6 months and 26 days.

The government obtained the confidence in the Senate on 3 August 1960, with 126 votes in favor, 58 against and 36 abstentions, and in the Chamber of Deputies on 5 August 1960, with 310 votes in favor, 156 against and 96 abstentions.

It was also known as Government of parallel convergences.

Composition

References

Italian governments
1960 establishments in Italy
1962 disestablishments in Italy
Cabinets established in 1960
Cabinets disestablished in 1962